Sewickley is a borough in Allegheny County, Pennsylvania, United States,  west northwest of Pittsburgh along the Ohio River. It is a residential suburb of the Pittsburgh metropolitan area. The population was 3,907 at the 2020 census. The Sewickley Bridge crosses the Ohio River from Sewickley to Moon Township.

Etymology
Historian Charles A. Hanna suggested "Sewickley" came from Creek words for "raccoon" (sawi) and "town" (ukli). According to Hanna, the Asswikale branch of the Shawnee probably borrowed their name from the neighboring Sawokli Muscogee before the former's migration from present-day South Carolina to Pennsylvania. Contemporary accounts from noted anthropologist Frederick Webb Hodge and the Sewickley Presbyterian Church, as well as the current Sewickley Valley Historical Society concur to varying degrees with Hanna's etymology. Some locals alternatively consider Sewickley to be a Native American word meaning "sweet water."

History

The valley surrounding the Big Sewickley Creek was surveyed in 1785 and sold to American Revolutionary War veterans. After the Battle of Fallen Timbers in 1794, settlers began to trickle in to the area, with flatboats, keelboats, and steamboats forming an industry along the Ohio River.

In 1837, the Edgeworth Female Seminary was moved from Pittsburgh to what was then called Sewickley Bottom. The following year, Sewickley Academy was founded. Becoming a small center for education, by 1840 the community was formally established as Sewickleyville. The borough was incorporated as simply Sewickley on July 6, 1853, after growth continued as the Pittsburgh, Fort Wayne and Chicago Railway was built through the area.

In 1911, the Sewickley Bridge was completed, bringing an end to the ferry industry. Ohio River Boulevard, later designated a part of Pennsylvania Route 65, was completed in 1934.

Geography
Sewickley is located at 40°32.25′N 80°10.5′W (40.5390, -80.1807).

Surrounding and adjacent neighborhoods
Sewickley has four land borders with Edgeworth to the northwest, Glen Osborne to the southwest, Sewickley Heights to the northeast, and Aleppo Township to the east.  Across the Ohio River, Sewickley runs adjacent with Moon Township and Coraopolis with the Sewickley Bridge as the direct link to the former.

Along with the four land borders, plus Bell Acres, Glenfield, Haysville, Leetsdale, Leet Township, and Sewickley Hills, Sewickley is located in the Quaker Valley School District. Together, these boroughs and townships constitute a loosely defined region in northwestern Allegheny County. Most of these municipalities – not including Leetsdale and parts of Leet Township – share the Sewickley post office and its 15143 zip code.

Demographics

The population of Sewickley peaked in the 1960 census, with over 6,000 residents. As of the 2010 census, there were 3,827 people with 1,765 households and 950 families residing in the borough's 1,965 housing units. The racial makeup of the borough was 88.8% White, 7.3% African American, with the remainder of other races or multi-racial.  No other single race represented more than 2% of the population.  Hispanics represented less than 2% of the population.

According to the 2011–15 American Community Survey, the median household income in the borough was about $91,735 and the median family income was $118,507. The per capita income for the borough was about $54,149.

Government and politics

Sewickley is divided into wards and is governed by a mayor and a nine-member borough council composed of three members from each ward. Members are elected to four-year terms. The current mayor of Sewickley is George Shannon. The current members of council are Jeff Neff (President), Todd Renner (Vice President), Sean Figley (President Pro Tempore), Christine Allen, Julie Barnes, Ed Green, Cynthia Mullins, Larry Rice, and Thomas Rostek.

Education

There are several private schools in the area, including Sewickley Academy, St. James Catholic School, Eden Christian Academy, and Montessori Children's Community. The public school system, Quaker Valley School District, is renowned for an innovative laptop-technology grant received in 2000 from former Pennsylvania governor Tom Ridge. Quaker Valley School District is often regarded as one of the best and academically top-ranked school districts in the nation. In the spring of 2006, U.S. News & World Report ranked Quaker Valley High School among the top 2% of high schools nationwide. The Sewickley Public Library of the Quaker Valley School District is a Library Journal Star Library for the third year in a row  and is continuously one of the top 25 largest libraries in the Pittsburgh Business Times Book of Lists.

Health care
Sewickley is home to Sewickley Valley Hospital, which is part of the Heritage Valley Health System. Heritage Valley Sewickley provides comprehensive health care for residents of Allegheny, Beaver, Butler and Lawrence counties in Pennsylvania; eastern Ohio and the panhandle of West Virginia.

Heritage Valley offers medical, surgical and diagnostic services at its hospitals, community satellite facilities and in physician offices.  Heritage Valley Health System's affiliated physician groups include Heritage Valley Medical Group, Tri-State Obstetrics and Gynecology and Heritage Valley Pediatrics.

Sewickley Cemetery
In 1860 Sewickley Cemetery was opened. The cemetery is now the resting place of more than 12,000 people. There are also two war memorials located on the burial grounds.

Civil War Memorial
There is a monument celebrating the local Civil War veterans - it is 20 feet tall and was installed in 2005. There was an 1866 statue which depicted a soldier on bended knee; but that statue was damaged from many years of weather.

Tuskegee Airmen Memorial
The Tuskegee Airmen have been memorialized in the cemetery with two large black granite blocks. the blocks are inscribed with the names of Western Pennsylvania veterans. Another block shows a depiction of two planes engaged in aerial combat.

Notable people

Tom Barrasso, former Pittsburgh Penguins goalie 
Michael Cerveris, actor and musician
Caitlin Clarke, Broadway and film star
Dan Cortese, actor and former MTV VJ
Sidney Crosby, Pittsburgh Penguins player
William Fitzsimmons, musician
Sergei Gonchar, Pittsburgh Penguins assistant coach and former player
Christa Harmotto, Olympic volleyball player
Franco Harris, retired Pittsburgh Steelers player
Chuck Knox, former NFL head coach
Ray Krawczyk, professional baseball player
Mario Lemieux, former Pittsburgh Penguins player
Evgeni Malkin, Pittsburgh Penguins player
Wentworth Miller, actor, graduated from Quaker Valley High School
Charles I. Murray, Brigadier General, USMC; recipient of Navy Cross and Army Distinguished Service Cross
Chuck Noll, longtime NFL head coach
Rissi Palmer, country music artist
Keith Rothfus, former U.S. Representative for Pennsylvania's 12th district
Bianca Smith, professional baseball coach
George R. Stewart, author
Kathleen Tessaro, novelist
Mike Tomczak, former Pittsburgh Steelers quarterback
Ken Whitlock, pro football player, first black player for the Toronto Argonauts

In popular culture
In 1995, the movie Roommates was filmed in and around Pittsburgh, Pennsylvania including Sewickley. Roommates starred Peter Falk, D. B. Sweeney, and Julianne Moore, and was directed by Peter Yates. The same year, parts of the movie Houseguest was filmed in Sewickley including Sewickley's main streets, Broad Street and Beaver Street. The Bruegger's Bagels on Beaver Street was temporarily transformed into an operating McDonald's during shooting of Houseguest. In 2002, parts of The Mothman Prophecies were filmed in the Sewickley area. Scenes from the Netflix show Sweet Magnolias was also filmed at the intersection of Broad Street and Beaver Street. Scenes from Jack Reacher, starring Tom Cruise, and The Lifeguard, starring Kristen Bell, were filmed in the town near the Sewickley Manor apartments and condominiums. Foxcatcher, starring Steve Carell, Mark Ruffalo, and Channing Tatum, began filming in the Sewickley area in October 2012.

The fictional 1/24 scale town of Elgin Park, by artist and photographer Michael Paul Smith, was loosely based on Sewickley.

Sid Lang, a primary character in Wallace Stegner's 1987 novel Crossing to Safety, grew up in Sewickley.

See also
 List of cities and towns along the Ohio River

References

External links

Borough of Sewickley website
/ marketing campaign for Sewickley including a store directory and event calendar
Post-Gazette article on Sewickley Garden Tour

Pennsylvania populated places on the Ohio River
Populated places established in 1808
Pittsburgh metropolitan area
Boroughs in Allegheny County, Pennsylvania
1808 establishments in Pennsylvania